Before the 2016 season, the PVFA Cup will be hosted as an opening cup at Port Vila Municipal Stadium.

Teams

All teams and leagues are as off the 2014–15 season.

Matches  
The 26 teams participating were split into 4 groups, with the top 2 from each group advancing to the quarter-finals, and the winners of the two semi-finals facing off in the grand final.

Group stage

Group A

Group B

Group C

Group D

Awards

References 

Football competitions in Vanuatu
2016 in association football